is a public day school run by the Tokyo Metropolitan Government. The campus is located in Toyama 3-chome, Shinjuku-ku, Tokyo.

It has been designated as a Super Science High School (SSH) by the Ministry of Education, Culture, Sports, Science and Technology (MEXT). It has also been designated as part of the Team Medical (TM) project run by the Tokyo Metropolitan Government Board of Education (a project where students who wish to go on to medical school form a team).

Education policy
Develop your own personality
Respect effort and take responsibility
Enrich your mind and keep your body healthy

Recent timeline
 2004 — Becomes the first metropolitan high school to be designated as a Super Science High School by the Ministry of Education, Culture, Sports, Science and Technology (designated period is 3 years)
 2007 — Designated for the second term as a Super Science High School (designated period is 5 years)
 2012 — Starts a 2-year transitional period as a Super Science High School
 2014 — Designated for the third term as a Super Science High School (designated period is 5 years)
 2016 — Designated as a Team Medical (TM) school
 2017 — 130th anniversary of the school's foundation. A commemorative ceremony is held in September. Renovation work of the martial arts building starts
 2019 — Designated for the fourth term as a Super Science High School (up to 2023)

Access
 1 minute on foot from Nishi-waseda Station on the Tokyo Metro Fukutoshin Line.
 10 minutes on foot from Takadanobaba Station on the Yamanote Line, Seibu Shinjuku Line, and Tokyo Metro Tozai Line.

Notable alumni
 Tadatoshi Fujimaki (manga artist)
 Masato Hagiwara (actor)
 Tomoyuki Hoshino (author)
 Kiyoshi Jinzai (novelist)
 Nana Katase (actress)
 Hiroshi Komiyama (scientist)
 Shinichiro Kurimoto (author and politician)
 Ichiro Miyashita (politician)
 Tadashi Sasaki (banker)
 Hideo Shima (engineer)
 Mitsuru Yoshida (author)

References

 Website of Tokyo Metropolitan Board of Education
 Minkou site

External links
 Zyuken.net website

High schools in Japan
High schools in Tokyo
Educational institutions established in 1888
1888 establishments in Japan